Norton Canon is a village and civil parish in Herefordshire, England, near the A480 road and the B4230 road. The population at the 2011 Census was 242.

References

Villages in Herefordshire